Peter Wolff was a politician.

Peter Wolff may also refer to:

 Peter A. Wolff (1923–2013), American physicist
 Peter Wolff Trust Supports the John Whiting Award
 Victor Beaumont (born Peter Wolff, 1912–1977), German-born British film and television actor

See also
 Peter Wolfe (disambiguation)
 Peter Wolf (disambiguation)